Alejandro Gabriel Quintana (born 20 February 1992), commonly known as Alejandro Quintana, is an Argentine professional footballer who plays as a forward for Colombian club América de Cali.

Career
Quintana was born in Buenos Aires, Argentina.

In January 2018, Quintana joined reigning African champions Wydad Casablanca.

References

External links
 Profile at BDFA 
 

1992 births
Living people
Argentine footballers
Argentine expatriate footballers
Association football forwards
Footballers from Buenos Aires
Primera B Metropolitana players
Primera Nacional players
Argentine Primera División players
Bolivian Primera División players
Ascenso MX players
Botola players
Club Atlético Huracán footballers
CSyD Tristán Suárez footballers
Club Atlético Brown footballers
Club Atlético Platense footballers
Universitario de Sucre footballers
Club Blooming players
Wydad AC players
Cafetaleros de Chiapas footballers
Sport Boys Warnes players
Guabirá players
Atlético Bucaramanga footballers
América de Cali footballers
Expatriate footballers in Bolivia
Argentine expatriate sportspeople in Bolivia
Expatriate footballers in Morocco
Argentine expatriate sportspeople in Morocco
Expatriate footballers in Mexico
Argentine expatriate sportspeople in Mexico
Expatriate footballers in Colombia
Argentine expatriate sportspeople in Colombia